Samuel Francis Raybould (11 June 1875 – 1949) was an English professional footballer. He played as a striker and is most renowned for his days playing for Liverpool.

Life and playing career
Raybould was born in Staveley, Derbyshire and played for Poolsbrook United, Staveley Colliery and North Staveley before joining Chesterfield Town on trial. His trial wasn't successful, and he moved to Ilkeston Town from where he joined Derby County in 1894.

Despite scoring twice in five games for Derby, Raybould returned to non-league football with Ilkeston Town, subsequently playing for Poolsbrook United, Ilkeston Town (for a third spell) and Bolsover Colliery before joining New Brighton Tower in 1899.

He scored ten times in just 13 league games for New Brighton Tower and was signed by manager Tom Watson for Liverpool in January 1900. He made his debut on 13 January 1900 in a 2–0 win over W.B.A at Anfield and scored his first goal for the club a week later on 20 January in the Merseyside derby at Goodison Park a game which saw Everton win 3–1.

Originally an outside right, he switched to centre forward at Liverpool and became a highly successful goalscorer. In the 1902–03 season Raybould set a new record of 31 league goals in a single league season. This record stood until 1931 when Gordon Hodgson broke it by scoring 36 goals.

In 1903 he, along with John Glover and William Goldie were given a seven-month ban from football for agreeing to 'financial inducements' to sign for Southern League Portsmouth. Portsmouth tried to use lack of regulations of transfers between the leagues to their advantage, but their approach was judged illegal. Raybould was suspended for seven months for agreeing to sign for Pompey. He was also given a lifetime ban on ever signing for the south-coast side. Without Raybould Liverpool slumped from fifth place to relegation candidates. His ban lasted until 31 December 1903 but was selected for the first team straight away in January. Raybould scored four goals from 15 games but could not prevent the reds dropping into the Second Division. However, he helped Liverpool to the second division title, contributing 19 goals and went on to score a total of 130 goals in 226 appearances for Liverpool, and remained their record goalscorer for 37 years. As of 2022, he stands as the eleventh highest goalscorer in Liverpool's history, ninth by his league goals.

His record of scoring 67 goals in his first 100 games for Liverpool stood until 2020 when he was overtaken by Mohamed Salah.

After leaving Liverpool in 1907, Raybould moved first to Sunderland where he scored 12 goals in 28 appearances in his solitary season there. He ended his league career at Woolwich Arsenal. He made his Arsenal debut against Everton on 2 September 1908 and played 30 times for Arsenal that season, scoring seven goals.

He left league football in 1909, joining non-league Chesterfield and subsequently playing for Sutton Town and Barlborough United.

Raybould never gained international recognition but was selected 3 times to represent the Football League against the Scottish League.

Personal life
Raybould married Selima Wilkes on 24 December 1897, when he described himself as a miner.

Raybould died in 1949.

Career statistics 
Goals and Appearances by club, season and competition.

References

External links
 Player profile at Liverpoolfc.tv
 Player profile at LFChistory.net

1875 births
1949 deaths
People from Staveley, Derbyshire
Footballers from Derbyshire
English footballers
Ilkeston Town F.C. (1880s) players
Derby County F.C. players
Bolsover Colliery F.C. players
New Brighton Tower F.C. players
Liverpool F.C. players
Sunderland A.F.C. players
Arsenal F.C. players
Chesterfield F.C. players
Ashfield United F.C. players
English Football League players
First Division/Premier League top scorers
English Football League representative players
Association football forwards